Lovers Lane station is a DART Light Rail station in Dallas, Texas. It is located at Lovers Lane and US 75 (North Central Expressway) in North Dallas.

References

External links
 DART - Lovers Lane Station

Dallas Area Rapid Transit light rail stations in Dallas
Railway stations in the United States opened in 1997
1997 establishments in Texas
Railway stations in Dallas County, Texas